The Orwell Prize, based at University College London, is a British prize for political writing. The Prize is awarded by The Orwell Foundation, an independent charity (Registered Charity No 1161563, formerly "The Orwell Prize") governed by a board of trustees. Four prizes are awarded each year: one each for a fiction (established 2019) and non-fiction book on politics, one for journalism and one for "Exposing Britain's Social Evils" (established 2015); between 2009 and 2012, a fifth prize was awarded for blogging. In each case, the winner is the short-listed entry which comes closest to George Orwell's own ambition to "make political writing into an art".

In 2014, the Youth Orwell Prize was launched, targeted at school years 9 to 13 in order to "support and inspire a new generation of politically engaged young writers". In 2015, The Orwell Prize for Exposing Britain's Social Evils, sponsored and supported by the Joseph Rowntree Foundation, was launched.

The British political theorist Sir Bernard Crick founded The Orwell Prize in 1993, using money from the royalties of the hardback edition of his biography of Orwell. Its current sponsors are Orwell's son Richard Blair, The Political Quarterly, the Joseph Rowntree Foundation and the Orwell Estate's literary agents, A. M. Heath. The Prize was formerly sponsored by the Media Standards Trust and Reuters. Bernard Crick remained chair of the judges until 2006; since 2007, the media historian Professor Jean Seaton has been the Director of the Prize. Judging panels for all four prizes are appointed annually.

Winners and shortlists

The Orwell Prize for Political Fiction (2019–present)

The Orwell Prize for Political Writing (2019–present)

Combined book category (1994–2018)

Beginning with 2019, the Book prize was split into fiction and non-fiction categories.

The Orwell Prize for Journalism (1994–present )

The Orwell Prize for Exposing Britain's Social Evils (2015–present)

Blog category (2009–2012)

Special prizes
In addition to the four regular prizes, the judges may choose to award a special prize.

In 2007, BBC's Newsnight programme was given a special prize, the judges noting, "When we were discussing the many very fine pieces of journalism that were submitted Newsnight just spontaneously emerged in our deliberations as the most precious and authoritative home for proper reporting of important stories, beautifully and intelligently crafted by journalists of rare distinction."

In 2008, Clive James was given a special award.

In 2009, Tony Judt was given a lifetime achievement award.

In 2012, a posthumous award was made to Christopher Hitchens in 2012, his book Arguably having been longlisted that year.

In 2013, Marie Colvin received a special prize for On the Front Line. She had been killed earlier that year while on assignment in Homs, Syria.

In 2014, the Guardian columnist Jonathan Freedland was given a special award, after having been shortlisted for the Journalism Prize that year.

Controversy
In 2008 the winner in the Journalism category was Johann Hari. In July 2011 the Council of the Orwell Prize decided to revoke Hari's award and withdraw the prize. Public announcement was delayed as Hari was then under investigation by The Independent for professional misconduct. In September 2011 Hari announced that he was returning his prize "as an act of contrition for the errors I made elsewhere, in my interviews", although he "stands by the articles that won the prize". A few weeks later, the Council of the Orwell Prize confirmed that Hari had returned the plaque but not the £2,000 prize money, and issued a statement that one of the articles submitted for the prize, "How multiculturalism is betraying women", published by The Independent in April 2007, "contained inaccuracies and conflated different parts of someone else's story (specifically, a report in Der Spiegel)".

Hari did not initially return the prize money of £2,000. He later offered to repay the money, but Political Quarterly, responsible for paying the prize money in 2008, instead invited Hari to make a donation to English PEN, of which George Orwell was a member. Hari arranged with English PEN to make a donation equal to the value of the prize, to be paid in installments once Hari returned to work at The Independent. However, Hari did not return to work at The Independent.

References

External links

1994 establishments in the United Kingdom
Awards established in 1994
British journalism awards
British literary awards
George Orwell
Political book awards
Internet-based-writing awards
British non-fiction literary awards